"Holiday" is a song by Australian recording artist, Vanessa Amorosi. "Holiday" was released in Australia as the fourth and final single from Amorosi's fourth studio album Hazardous (2009). It was digitally released on 13 August 2010.

On Sunday, 22 August 2010 Amorosi performed the song as special guest live on the Australian light entertainment reality show "Dancing with the Stars" on Channel Seven.

Amorosi said "Holiday' is one of her favourite tracks on the album: Holiday is inspired by a fantasy of escaping to a far off island, warm weather, with sand at my feet, partying all night and dancing till dawn".

The accompanying video was shot in the UK and directed by Dan Ruttley.

Track listing
Music download – EP
"Holiday" – 3:16
"Holiday" (Buzz Junkies remix) [Radio edit] – 3:51
"Mr. Mysterious" (Dance Dude Macho Psycho remix) – 4:09

Charts

Release history

References

2010 singles
Vanessa Amorosi songs
Songs written by Vanessa Amorosi
Song recordings produced by MachoPsycho
2010 songs
Universal Music Group singles